Superwog1 or just simply Superwog, is a YouTube duo consisting of two Australian brothers, Theodore and Nathan Saidden. The channel consists of various videos including comedies and skits. They have gained over 3 million subscribers and 456 million video views. They have produced a television comedy series based on their YouTube sketch comedies. The series follows Theo, aka "Superwog", his family, and his friend Johnny, getting into all kinds of trouble throughout the Australian suburbia. 

Produced by Princess Pictures with production support from Film Victoria, the original series was developed in association with Screen Australia and YouTube through the "Skip Ahead" initiative. The six part series was the first Australian long-form series to be released on YouTube, followed by ABC linear channel, and at its conclusion had reached 13.5 million people across YouTube alone, with another 1 million plus reached across ABC. ABC Comedy.

The series premiered on 9 October 2018, following a successful pilot aired in 2017. On 11 November 2020, a second season was announced, and all 6 episodes finally aired on 13 June 2021 on ABC iview.

On 24 August 2022, both long form seasons of the series were released worldwide on Netflix. However, due to the term wog being considered an ethnic slur to people from the Mediterranean and Middle Eastern regions, Superwog is displayed as Superbro on versions of Netflix outside of Australia. On 2 September of that same year, a short sketch titled Meeting with Netflix was uploaded to the official Superwog YouTube channel, as a way to promote the series' arrival to the streaming site.

Background
The Superwog series is based on characters from the YouTube channel of the same name, created by brothers Theodore and Nathan Saidden. The series depicts humorous situations involving the titular character, an archetypal wog. The two cited Sacha Baron Cohen, Chris Lilley and Fat Pizza as influences for the series, and drew inspiration from their childhoods, noting they would "re-enact scenes of [their] mum and dad fighting" and "derive a lot of observational comedy from their arguments". The Saidden brothers began filming and uploading Superwog videos to their YouTube channel in 2008, while Theo was studying law at university.

The YouTube series gained notable popularity, and has been adapted into stage shows. The series launched for Adult Swim in 2013, and in 2017, formed part of The Slot sketch comedy series. In 2019, the Saidden brothers began performing Superwog as a live show in Australia and New Zealand.

Production
The Superwog pilot was produced by Paul Walton at Princess Pictures and supported by Screen Australia and Google, funded through Skip Ahead. It was written and created by Theodore and Nathan Saidden. Uploaded to YouTube on 16 July 2017, it quickly rose to #1 on the trending page on Australian YouTube in 2017, with over 14 million views.

The pilot follows Superwog (Theodore Saidden) and his friend Johnny (Nathan Saidden), who work at a fast-food store.

Main cast & Characters
 Theo (Theodore Saidden) - a teenager going by the moniker, 'Superwog', he spends much of his time aggravating his Dad or hatching schemes with Johnny 
 Johnny (Nathan Saidden) - Theo's best friend, an idiot savant, attempting to be the voice of reason at times 
 Dad (Nathan Saidden)
 Mum (Theodore Saidden)
 Max (Sasha Sutton) - Max plays straight man to Theo and Johnny's antics, eventually becoming a police officer before they get him fired

Guest cast by episode

Pilot
 Alicia Banit as the Neighbour 
 Chloe Walton as Girl
 Sasha Sutton as Max
 Fiona Harris as Amanda
 Lucia Smyrk as Lisa
 Damien Aylward as Grant
 Matthew Andreadis as Mark (credited as Matt Andreadis)
 Noah Mountjoy as Joel
 Louie Anthanasiou as the 40-Year-Old Wog
 Dorothy Adams as the Old Lady
 Basil Van Dongen as the Old Man
 Diamond Lust as Milf
 Sally-Anne Upton as Charlene
 Sam Hamilton as the Skinny son

Season 1

Episode 1 (Breaking Dad)
 Malik Keegan as Young Superwog 
 Andrew Blackman as the Foster Dad 
 Carla Bonner as the Foster Mother 
 Declan Barker as Jack
 Renai Caruso as the DOCS Worker
 Carolyn Bock as Mrs Harwood
 Graham Jahne as Police Officer #1
 Adrian Pickering as Police Officer #2
 Holland Brooks as Young Babe
 Penny Macklin as the Old Lady Neighbour
 Dorothy Deller as the Old Lady Flasher

Episode 2 (The Family Jewels)
 Sarah Golding as the Bikini Store Assistant
 Ben Klarenaar as Hardware Store Worker #1
 Colin Hood as Hardware Store Worker #2
 Jim Knobeloch as the American Dad
 Britini Leslie as the American Mum
 Edwin Howell as the American Son
 Brendan Bacon as the Australian Truck Driver 
 Huong To as the Vietnamese Lady
 Drew Weston as the Boxing MC
 Jasmine Rees as Boxing Ring Girl #1
 Diamond Lust as Boxing Ring Girl #2
 Ryan Preusker as Tradie #1
 Shane Stevens as Tradie #2
 Chris Weir as Bikie #1 and Superwog Driving Double
 Chris Chalmers as Bikie #2 
 Adrian Pickering as the Wog Dad Stunt Double

Episode 3 (The Final Exam)
 Akmal Saleh as the Janitor
 Jason Buckley as Mr Johnson
 Ben Grant as Teacher #1
 Warren Egger as Teacher #2
 Alexandra Axford as Teacher #3
 Roberta Connelly as the Respectable Teacher
 Jutta Roderick as the Old Lady Teacher
 Jennifer Jarman as the Librarian
 Maureen Andrew as the Exam Lady
 Michael Cormick as the Doctor
 Frank Fazio as Medical Student #1
 Lyndon Cantwell as Medical Student #2
 Henry Qian as Dr Chan
 Andrew Brown as the Patient
 Jasmine Rees as Fantasy Girl #1
 Diamond Lust as Fantasy Girl #2
 Charlie Mhaya as the Pizza Kid
 Charlie Stocks as Student #1
 Patrick Cotton as Student #2
 Gregory Ross as the School Deputy

Episode 4 (The Formal)
 Alicia Banit as Holly
 Courtney Louise as Rachel
 Hannah Cliff as Samantha
 Toby Derrick as Jackson
 Nicholas Remman as Joel
 Annette Cozzo as Grandma
 Tara Bilston as Hot Gym Girl
 Julia Grenda as the Pharmacist
 Kristy Kelly as Aunty
 Marcus Barber as Greg
 Sandra Miller as Noellene
 Jason Buckley as Mr Johnson
 Liv Rian as Babe #1
 Nicole Coombs as Babe #2
 Ellen Grimshaw as Formal Babe #1
 Dearbhla Stynes as Formal Babe #2
 David Hart as the Horrified Teacher

Episode 5 (The Power Trip)
 Thomas Little as Steve
 Nell Feeney as the Concierge
 Francesca Waters as the Energy Worker
 Janine Atwill as the Anchorwoman
 Damian Oehme as the Bitcoin Expert
 Mark Casamento as the Ferrari Dealer
 Tara Bilston as Office Worker 1
 Julia Grenda as Office Worker 2
 Kristy Kelly as Office Worker 3
 Marcus Barber as Greg
 Sandra Miller as Noellene
 Tony Ting as Asian IT Worker #1 (credited as Anthony Ting)
 Chang Yuyi as Asian IT Worker #2 
 Kym Wang as Asian IT Worker #3

Episode 6 (The Zombie Apocalypse)
 Sasha Sutton as the Ranger
 Alicia Banit as Holly
 Sean Ryan as the Big Survivor
 Joseph Green as the Young Male
 Diamond Lust as the Hot Zombie
 William Tisdall as the Homeless Zombie
 Mary Hill as Mrs Zombie
 Adam Davis as Zombie #1
 Daniel Solis as Zombie #2
 Will Jones as Zombie #3
 Paul Rochford as Zombie #4
 Dave Mondon as Zombie #5
 Chris Chalmers as Zombie #6
 Adrian Pickering as Zombie #7

Season 2

Episode 1 (The P Plates)
 Nick Farnell as the Neighbour
 Sally-Anne Upton as Charlene
 Pia Gould as the Nice Counter Lady
 Bernard Sam as the Asian Kid
 Damien Aylward as the Parking Officer
 Kate Fitzgerald as the Police Officer
 Brett Swain as Council Worker #1
 Mitchell Brotz as the Sleepy Guy
 Jonathan Schuster as the Easy Examiner
 Alex Pinder as the Examiner
 Graham Jahne as the Old Lady Neighbour
 Adrian Pickering as Council Worker #2
 Mark Cosgriff as the Old White Male
 Colin Masters as Male #1
 Juan Olier as Male #2

Episode 2 (The Lawsuit)
 Rachel McCann as Lilly
 Angela Padula as Grandma
 Silas James as the Coles Manager
 Vivienne Gorman as Mrs Tutuankhamun
 Marty Rhone as the Judge
 Fiona Macleod as the Nurse
 Tony Rickards as the Lawyer
 Roger Oakley as the Barrister
 Hayden Spencer as the Coles Lawyer
 Artemis Ioannides as the Female Cousin
 Joseph Green as the Self Righteous Guy
 Lynn Geraghty as the Old Supermarket Lady
 Michael Stocks as the Food Court Worker
 Tina Jackson as the Journalist
 Ross Grant as the Newsagent
 Miranda Bloom as Lilly's Hot Friend
 June Leijon as the Old Woman at the Food Court
 Ian Sutherland as the Old Man at the Food Court
 Cathy Dickinson as the Lady Spectator
 Chen Wu as Someone To Help
 Kelly Dykes as Margaret

Episode 3 (The Magpie)
 Tom McCathie as the Neighbour
 Janet Watson Kruse as the Council Worker
 Sahil Gulati as the Attendant 
 Xander Barling as the Hardware Store Worker
 Drew Tingwell as the Petrol Station Manager
 Corey Hunt as Boat Guy #1
 Gregory J. Fryer as Boat Guy #2 (credited as Greg Fryer)
 Jye Hawley as the Fuel Customer
 Tim Bell as the Man at Water's Edge
 Ann Marie Eastman as the Wife
 Bill Weaver as the Radio Announcer 
 Paul Esmonde as Middle Aged Man #1
 Gabby Llewelyn as Middle Aged Man #2
 Andy Nguyen as the Parklea Attendant 
 Tahlee Fereday as the Liquor Store Customer (credited as Tahlee Feraday)
 Rian Goodge as Superwog Double
 Adrian Pickering as Johnny and Wog Dad Double
 Colin Masters as the Wog Dad Double
 Juan Olier as Male #2

Episode 4 (Something Fishy)
 Sergio De Nardo as the Father In-Law
 Marta Kaczmarek as the Mother In-Law
 John Orcsik as the Police Officer
 Gary Dressler as the Register Man at the Liquor Store
 Deidre Rubenstein as Agnes (credited as Deidre Rubstein)
 Tegan Crowley as the Caretaker
 Lee Andrikopoulos as the Auctioneer (credited as Lee Andrikopoulis)
 Ben Anderson as the Bus Driver
 Joseph Green as the Self Righteous Guy
 Young Kim as the Fish Market Attendant
 Kiu Wai Miu as a Bidder (credited as Michael Kiu)
 Joshua Lim as a Bidder
 Li Wenqiang as a Bidder (credited as Wengxiang Li)
 Martyn Jones as the Fish Market Manager
 Will Jones as Police Officer Stunt Double
 Matthew Campbell as the Bus Driver Double (credited as Matthew 'Chippa' Campbell)
 Reg Roordink as the Convenience Store Owner Stunt Double

Episode 5 (The Lump)
 Sergio De Nardo as the Father In-Law
 Marta Kaczmarek as the Mother In-Law
 Thomas Little as Steve
 Fiona Macleod as the Traige Nurse
 David Whiteley as the Head Surgeon (credited as David Whitely)
 Genevieve Kingsford as the Forgetful Nurse
 Tom Milton as the Dyslexic Doctor
 Dean Cartmel as the Duty Surgeon
 Louise Crawford as the Soft Nurse
 Joseph Green as the Self Righteous Guy
 Gabriella Barbagallo as the Manager Nurse
 Chloe Ng as the Break Up Nurse

Episode 6 (21 Jump Ya)
 Sasha Sutton as Max Patterson
 Kate Fitts as the Police Officer
 Marty Rhone as the Judge
 John Orcsik as the Head Police Officer
 Luke Ha as Ming
 Tasi Niumata as Bob
 Joseph Green as the Self Righteous Guy
 Josh Hayes as a cell mate
 Alexander Dehany as a cell mate (credited as Alexander Dehaney)
 James Polidano as a cell mate
 Julia Zhang as the Yum Cha Lady
 Barbara Ward as a Couple Member
 Stewart Ward as a Couple Member
 Matthew Deller as the Homeless Guy
 Daniel Solis as the Police Officer Stunt Double
 Graham Jahne as the Security Guard Double and Stuntman

Episodes

Season 1

Season 2

See also

List of Australian television series

References

External links
 

2018 Australian television series debuts
2010s Australian comedy television series
2010s sitcoms
Australian Broadcasting Corporation original programming
Australian television sitcoms
English-language television shows
Television shows set in Sydney
2020s YouTube series
Australian YouTubers